Odet de Turnèbe (23 October 1552 – 20 July 1581) was a French dramatist.

Biography
Odet de Turnèbe was born in Paris to Greek scholar Adrien Turnèbe. He received a solid education and was known, from an early age, for his intelligence and wit. After having served as a lawyer in the Parlement of Paris, he was chosen to become first president of the Cour des monnaies, but he succumbed to a fever and died at the age of 28.

Works
He wrote a comedy in prose, Les Contents (written c. 1580, published after his death) which was largely inspired (like the works of his contemporary Pierre de Larivey) by contemporary Italian comedy. Turnèbe also wrote three Petrarchian sonnets (the first in French, the second in Italian and the third in Spanish), a poem entitled La Puce (using a Latinized version of his name: Odet de Tournebu) and twelve sonnets entitled Sonets sur les ruines de Luzignan addressed to Catherine Des Roches (with whom he declared himself in love).

References
This article is based on the equivalent article from the French Wikipedia, consulted on 30 October 2007.
Les Conten[t]s - critical edition edited by Norman B. Spector, Paris, Didier, 1961

Writers from Paris
1552 births
1581 deaths
16th-century French dramatists and playwrights
16th-century French poets